May Henriquez (6 May 1915 – 15 October 1999) was a Curaçaoan writer and sculptress. Henriquez wrote and translated works in Papiamentu, the Portuguese-based creole language spoken in Curaçao. She was recognised for her work for the Curaçaoan art community.

Biography
Henriquez was born May Alvarez Correa on 6 May 1915 in Willemstad, Curaçao in a family of Sephardi merchants. Her father was co-founder of Maduro & Curiel's Bank and her mother was a member of the Maduro family. At home, the language was Papiamentu. After finishing high school, she was privately taught by minister H.E. Eldermans who helped develop her interest for the arts. At age of 20, she married Max Henriquez, an engineer for Royal Dutch Shell in Venezuela, and they moved to Lagunillas, Venezuela.

During World War II, her husband started to work for Maduro & Curiel's Bank, they returned to Curaçao and took up residence in Landhuis Bloemhof. In 1947, they moved to Caracas for business, where Henriquez enrolled in a sculpturing course with Ernest Maragall. Between 1949 and 1953, she would spend several months a year in Paris at the Académie de la Grande Chaumière, where she was taught by Ossip Zadkine. 

Henriquez set up a studio in the carriage house of Landhuis Bloemhof. She started to take interest in the Curaçao cultural scene, and in 1950 was co-founder of the Scientific Library which is nowadays part of the University of Curaçao, and became chairperson of the Cultural Advisory Commission of Curaçao. Her estate developed into a meeting place for the art scene attracting artists like Cola Debrot, Corneille and Peter Struycken.

In 1953, Henriquez started translating plays in Papiamentu. The play Ami, Dokter? Lubidá!, a translation of Le Médecin malgré lui by Molière, was successful. This encouraged Henriquez to start translating and adapting more works into Papiamentu. Henriquez was considered a talented sculptor. and remained active until the mid 1970s when she started to focus on writing. 

In 1981, Henriquez published Yaya ta konta, a collection of original stories based on the oral traditions of Curaçao. In 1988, she published Ta asina o ta asana?, a study on the influence of the Sephardi Jews on the development of Papiamentu for which she was awarded the Pierre Lauffer Prize.

In 1982, Henriquez started to work for Maduro & Curiel's Bank, and became the president of the bank in 1996. In 1985, she became Officer in the Order of Orange-Nassau. Henriquez died on 15 October 1999.

Legacy
After her death, Landhuis Bloemhof, the estate where she lived, was turned into a museum and art gallery in her honour. Henriquez had acquired an extensive art collection and library during her lifetime. In 2017, Henriquez became the 12th Outstanding Woman of Curaçao for her work promoting Papiamentu. In the same year, she was also honoured with a postage stamp.

See also
Landhuis Bloemhof

References

1915 births
1999 deaths
People from Willemstad
Curaçao writers
Curaçao Jews
Papiamento-language writers
Curaçao artists
Officers of the Order of Orange-Nassau